Makarovka is a rural locality and the administrative center of Makarovsky Selsoviet Rural Settlement, Kurchatovsky District, Kursk Oblast, Russia. Population:

Geography 
The village is located on the Seym River and its tributary, the Tereblya, 58 km from the Russia–Ukraine border, 44 km west of Kursk, 7 km north-west of the district center – the town Kurchatov.

 Climate
Makarovka has a warm-summer humid continental climate (Dfb in the Köppen climate classification).

Transport 

The rural locality is situated 53 km from Kursk Vostochny Airport, 137 km from Belgorod International Airport and 257 km from Voronezh Peter the Great Airport.

References

Notes

Sources

Rural localities in Kurchatovsky District, Kursk Oblast